Stepanikha is a rural locality (a village) in Slednevskoye Rural Settlement, Alexandrovsky District, Vladimir Oblast, Russia. The population was 6 as of 2010.

Geography 
The village is located 10 km north-east from Slednevo, 7 km north from Alexandrov.

References 

Rural localities in Alexandrovsky District, Vladimir Oblast